Igor Mišan (born 5 May 1990) is a Bosnian Serb footballer who plays as a midfielder for Senglea Athletic.

Club career
Born in Bugojno, SR Bosnia and Herzegovina, then still within SFR Yugoslavia,  Mišan started playing football in Serbia in OFK Beograd youth team.  In 2007, he was promoted to the first team, however he first spent a loan at FK Radnički Sombor, and then a loan at FK Spartak Subotica where he played in the 2010–11 Serbian SuperLiga.  Next he moved to Serbian First League side RFK Novi Sad where he played between summer 2011 and the winter break of the 2012–13 season when he signed with FK Rudar Prijedor playing then in the Bosnian Premier League.  In summer 2014 he signed with MFK Karviná playing in the Czech Second League, but in December he left the club by mutual agreement as he spent most time injured.

On 17 August 2019 it was confirmed, that Mišan had joined Victoria Wanderers. He moved to Senglea Athletic in August 2020.

International career
Igor Mišan good exhibitions made him receive a call on behalf of coach Branimir Tutić to play for the Republika Srpska national under-23 football team against Udinese played on March 12, 2014, and he played as starter the entire match.

References

External links
 

1990 births
Living people
People from Bugojno
Serbs of Bosnia and Herzegovina
Association football midfielders
Bosnia and Herzegovina footballers
OFK Beograd players
FK Radnički Sombor players
FK Spartak Subotica players
RFK Novi Sad 1921 players
FK Rudar Prijedor players
MFK Karviná players
FK Mladost Velika Obarska players
NK Zvijezda Gradačac players
FK Radnik Surdulica players
Ħamrun Spartans F.C. players
Pembroke Athleta F.C. players
Senglea Athletic F.C. players
Serbian SuperLiga players
Serbian First League players
Premier League of Bosnia and Herzegovina players
Maltese Premier League players
Maltese Challenge League players
Gozo Football League First Division players
Bosnia and Herzegovina expatriate footballers
Expatriate footballers in Serbia
Bosnia and Herzegovina expatriate sportspeople in Serbia
Expatriate footballers in the Czech Republic
Bosnia and Herzegovina expatriate sportspeople in the Czech Republic
Expatriate footballers in Malta
Bosnia and Herzegovina expatriate sportspeople in Malta